The Western Illinois Correctional Center is a medium-security state prison for men located in Mount Sterling, Brown County, Illinois, owned and operated by the Illinois Department of Corrections.  

The facility was first opened in 1989, and has a working capacity of 2173.

References

Prisons in Illinois
Buildings and structures in Brown County, Illinois
1989 establishments in Illinois